Steven Jack Reingold (born 7 August 1998) is a South African-born English first-class cricketer.

Reingold was born at Cape Town in August 1998. He moved to England at a young age and was educated in London at the Jewish Free School, before going up to Cardiff University. While studying at Cardiff, he made his First-class debut for Cardiff MCCU against Somerset on 26 March 2019 and played against Sussex in the same year. He scored 29 runs in his two matches, while with his off break bowling he took 3 wickets at an expensive average of 85.33. He made his List A debut on 22 July 2021, for Glamorgan in the 2021 Royal London One-Day Cup.

References

External links

1998 births
Living people
Cricketers from Cape Town
South African emigrants to the United Kingdom
People educated at JFS (school)
Alumni of Cardiff University
English cricketers
Cardiff MCCU cricketers
Glamorgan cricketers